Serra da Mocidade National Park is a national park in the states of Amazonas and Roraima, Brazil.

Location

The park lies in the Amazon biome.
It was established on 29 April 1998, and is administered by the Chico Mendes Institute for Biodiversity Conservation.
The park covers parts of the municipalities of Barcelos, Amazonas and Caracaraí, Roraima.
It adjoins the Yanomami Indigenous Territory to the north.

The north west of the park has a complex of mountains isolated from other ranges of the Guianas.
It contains small meandering streams covered by upland forest, wetlands, rivers with distinctive chemical and biological properties (the Catrimani River and Água Boa do Univini River) and alluvial floodplains.  Some of the wetlands are strictly seasonal in nature.

Conservation

The park is classified as IUCN protected area category II (national park).
It has the objectives of preserving natural ecosystems of great ecological relevance and scenic beauty, enabling scientific research, environmental education, outdoors recreation and eco-tourism.
The conservation unit is supported by the Amazon Region Protected Areas Program.

Notes

Sources

1998 establishments in Brazil
National parks of Brazil
Protected areas of Roraima
Protected areas of Amazonas (Brazilian state)